Dweebs is an American sitcom that ran on CBS from September 22 to October 27, 1995, before it was canceled. Ten episodes were produced but only six aired.

Synopsis
The show stars Farrah Forke as Carey, a woman hired to be the office manager of a highly successful software company named Cyberbyte, owned by Warren Mosbey (Peter Scolari).

Warren and the other employees (played by actors Stephen Tobolowsky, David Kaufman, Corey Feldman and Adam Biesk), were stereotypical nerds or "dweebs", highly intelligent yet socially inept, contrasting with the character of Carey.

Cast
 Peter Scolari as Warren Mosbey
 Farrah Forke as Carey
 Corey Feldman as Vic
 David Kaufman as Morley
 Stephen Tobolowsky as Karl
 Adam Biesk as Todd

Episodes

Reception

The show gained a mixed reception from critics.

References

External links

Pazsaz Entertainment Network page

1990s American sitcoms
Television series by Warner Bros. Television Studios
1995 American television series debuts
1995 American television series endings
CBS original programming
English-language television shows
Television shows set in Seattle